Givotia madagascariensis, locally known as farafatsy, is a commercially valuable softwood tree endemic to the southwestern Madagascar province formally known as Toliara Province.

It is in the genus Givotia of the family Euphorbiaceae. Locals use it in building canoes and in folk medicine, and it has been investigated for antitumor substances.

References 

Crotonoideae
Taxa named by Henri Ernest Baillon